The Old U.S. Post Office and Courts Building is a historical 19th century brick government building, located in Jefferson, Marion County, Texas.

The building now houses the Jefferson Historical Museum. It was listed on the National Register of Historic Places in 1969.

History
Construction on the Romanesque Revival building with Greek Revival details started in 1888, and was completed by 1890.

It originally served as a courthouse of the United States District Court for the Eastern District of Texas, and as a U.S. post office.

The post office was on the first floor, the court was on the second.

The building was purchased by the Jefferson Historical Society for use as a museum in 1965.

See also

National Register of Historic Places listings in Marion County, Texas
Recorded Texas Historic Landmarks in Marion County

References

External links

Courthouses in Texas
Post office buildings in Texas
Jefferson, Texas
Buildings and structures in Marion County, Texas
Government buildings completed in 1890
Courthouses on the National Register of Historic Places in Texas
Post office buildings on the National Register of Historic Places in Texas
National Register of Historic Places in Marion County, Texas
1890 establishments in Texas
Brick buildings and structures
Towers in Texas
Greek Revival architecture in Texas
Romanesque Revival architecture in Texas